Erik Engelhardt (born 18 April 1998) is a German professional footballer who plays as a forward for VfL Osnabrück. He is a Germany youth international.

Club career
Engelhardt joined Hansa Rostock in the summer of 2019 on a two-year contract.

International career
He has represented Germany at under-16, under-18 and under-19 levels.

References

External links
 
 
 

Living people
1998 births
People from Kulmbach
Sportspeople from Upper Franconia
Footballers from Bavaria
German footballers
Association football forwards
Germany youth international footballers
3. Liga players
Regionalliga players
Oberliga (football) players
1. FC Nürnberg II players
FC Hansa Rostock players
FC Energie Cottbus players
VfL Osnabrück players